Cole Hotel, also known as Cole European Hotel, was a hotel in Fargo, North Dakota, United States. The hotel building was listed on the National Register of Historic Places in 1983 and was removed from the National Register in 2009.

Edward Cole entered the hotel business following the 1893 Fargo fire which destroyed all the first class hotels in the city.

References

Buildings and structures in Fargo, North Dakota
Hotel buildings on the National Register of Historic Places in North Dakota
Former National Register of Historic Places in North Dakota
National Register of Historic Places in Cass County, North Dakota
Hotel buildings completed in 1909